Edmund Sawyer may refer to:

Edmund Sawyer (historian)
Edmund Sawyer (MP)